= The Romanians Dowry =

The Romanians Dowry ((in Romanian): Zestrea Românilor), is a Romanian Television documentary serial dedicated to the traditional culture and civilization of Romanian people.
